The following is a list of feature films produced and distributed by the American studio Columbia Pictures from 1922, the year the company produced its first feature, until 1939. During these years Columbia emerged from Poverty Row to become one of the eight major studios of Hollywood.

1920s

1930s

References

Bibliography
 Blottner, Gene. Columbia Pictures Movie Series, 1926-1955: The Harry Cohn Years. McFarland, 2011.
 Dick, Bernard F. The Merchant Prince of Poverty Row: Harry Cohn of Columbia Pictures. University Press of Kentucky, 2014.

1922
American films by studio
Sony Pictures Entertainment Motion Picture Group